The FIBA Oceania Championship for Men 1993 was the qualifying tournament of FIBA Oceania for the 1994 FIBA World Championship. The tournament was held in Auckland.  won its 11th Oceania Championship to qualify for the World Championship.

Teams that did not enter

Results

Championship

Final standings

Australia qualified for the 1994 FIBA World Championship.

External links
 FIBA Archive

FIBA Oceania Championship
Championship
1993 in New Zealand basketball
1993 in Australian basketball
1993 in Samoan sport
International basketball competitions hosted by New Zealand
Australia men's national basketball team games
New Zealand men's national basketball team games